Ivanopil is an inhabited locality in Ukraine and it may refer to:

 Ivanopil, a town (urban-type settlement) in Chudniv Raion, Zhytomyr Oblast
 Ivanopil, Lityn Raion, a village in Lityn Raion, Vinnytsia Oblast
 Ivanopil, Korosten Raion, a village in Korosten Raion, Zhytomyr Oblast